The 2006 IIHF World U18 Championship Division III was an international under-18 ice hockey tournament run by the International Ice Hockey Federation. The Division III tournament made up the fourth level of competition at the 2006 IIHF World U18 Championships and took place between 13 and 19 March 2006 in Miercurea Ciuc, Romania. The tournament was won by Romania who upon winning gained promotion, along with Israel who finished in second place, to Division II of the 2007 IIHF World U18 Championships.

Overview
The 2006 IIHF World U18 Championship Division III began on 13 March 2006 in Miercurea Ciuc, Romania. Bulgaria, Israel, New Zealand and Turkey all returned to compete in the Division III competition after missing promotion at the previous years World Championships. Romania and South Africa entered the Division III competition after being relegated from the Division II tournaments of the 2005 IIHF World U18 Championships.

Romania finished first after winning all five of their games and gained promotion to Division II of the 2007 IIHF World U18 Championships. Israel who finished in second place also gained promotion to Division II, while South Africa finished third after managing to win only two and tie one of their five games of the tournament. Bulgaria and Turkey who finished fifth and sixth respectively were relegated to the Division III Qualification tournament for the 2007 IIHF World U18 Championships. Daniel Erlich of Israel finished as the tournaments top scorer after recording 26 points including 12 goals and 14 assists. Romania's Istvan Csergo finished as the tournaments leading goaltender with a save percentage of 96.00.

Standings

Fixtures
All times local.

Scoring leaders
List shows the top ten skaters sorted by points, then goals.

Leading goaltenders
Only the top five goaltenders, based on save percentage, who have played 40% of their team's minutes are included in this list.

References

IIHF World U18 Championship Division III
III
International ice hockey competitions hosted by Romania
IIHF World U18 Championship Division III